Burlingame station is a Caltrain commuter rail station in Burlingame, California. The station building was constructed in the Spanish Colonial Revival and Mission Revival architecture styles in 1894, opening for service on October 10 of that year. 18th-century tiles from the Mission San Antonio de Padua at Jolon and the Mission Dolores Asistencia at San Mateo were used for the station roof.

The station was designated a California Historical Landmark in 1971 and added to the National Register of Historic Places as Burlingame Railroad Station in 1978.

Burlingame has two side platforms serving the line's two tracks. Until 2008, the station had a southbound side platform and a narrow island platform between the tracks - a common configuration at Southern Pacific stations. This required use of the hold-out rule, where only one train could be at the station at a time. The northbound side platform was completed on February 25, 2008, followed by a new southbound platform on April 1, thus eliminating the hold-out rule.

References

External links

Caltrain - Burlingame station

Burlingame, California
History of San Mateo County, California
Railway stations in the United States opened in 1894
National Register of Historic Places in San Mateo County, California
Railway stations on the National Register of Historic Places in California
Caltrain stations in San Mateo County, California
Mission Revival architecture in California
Spanish Colonial Revival architecture in California
Former Southern Pacific Railroad stations in California